Khmylitsa is a rural locality (a village) in Tiginskoye Rural Settlement, Vozhegodsky District, Vologda Oblast, Russia. The population was 17 as of 2002.

Geography 
Khmylitsa is located 28 km northwest of Vozhega (the district's administrative centre) by road. Stolbikha is the nearest rural locality.

References 

Rural localities in Vozhegodsky District